Vasavi College of Engineering (Autonomous) (VCE) is a self-financed technical institution located in Ibrahimbagh, Hyderabad, India. It is 12 km from the city center. The institution is affiliated to Osmania University, Hyderabad. Founded in 1981 by the Vasavi Academy of Education, it is accredited by the National Board of Accreditation. The college was founded by Pendekanti Venkatasubbaiah, a statesman of independent India.

University Grants Commission and Osmania University, Hyderabad conferred autonomous status for the college with effect from 2014-15 academic year. The National Institutional Ranking Framework (NIRF) ranked it 187 among engineering colleges in 2020.

General 
VCE is the home for 170 faculty, 2300 students, and 100 administrative and supporting staff. The college has ten academic departments in engineering and science disciplines.

The entrance to VCE lies on the Mehdipatnam - Gandipet Road and is flanked by the Golconda Fort and Taramati Baradari. The campus, located 29 km from Shamshabad Airport, 27 km from Secunderabad railway station and 13 km from Nampally railway station, is well connected by buses.

The college provides transport facility to its students with College Private Buses
.

Departments 
 Civil Engineering
 Computer Science and Engineering
 Electronics and Communication Engineering
 Electrical and Electronics Engineering
 Information Technology
 Mechanical Engineering
 Computer Applications
 Chemistry
 Mathematics
 Physics
 Humanities and Social Sciences

The college offers undergraduate and postgraduate degrees in seven disciplines of engineering. Over 150 faculty members belonging to the engineering departments are engaged in teaching, research and industrial consultancy.

The academic calendar is organized on semester programs. English is the medium of instruction. The students are evaluated on a continuous basis throughout the semester in the form of tests(often referred to as Internals), class assignments and/or projects. The students are subject to a final exam conducted by Osmania University, with which lies the responsibility of the final evaluation. The final examination is usually referred to as Externals. The degrees are awarded by the university itself.

Undergraduate academics 
The four-year undergraduate program is offered for the six engineering disciplines of: 
 Civil Engineering
 Computer Science and Engineering
Computer Science & Engineering (Artificial Intelligence & Machine Learning)
 Electrical and Electronics Engineering
 Electronics and Communication Engineering
 Information Technology
 Mechanical Engineering

The students are subject to the evaluation process during their four-year program. The Internals constitute the tests and assignments that are conducted every semester. This is the usual academic activity during the semesters. The senior year students complete a research thesis under the guidance of the college faculty.

Intake 
The requirement for admission to the undergraduate program is to appear for the Engineering, Agricultural and Medical Common Entrance Test, referred to as EAMCET for intermediate students. This test, which is conducted every year, is competitive with over 300,000 writing the test each year. The candidates are also required to pass the examination of the Board of Intermediate Education, Government of Telangana with Mathematics, Physics and Chemistry as optional subjects, or any other examination recognized by the Osmania University as equivalent. As of 2021, 780 students are admitted into the undergraduate program every year.
 

Telangana State Engineering Common Entrance Test referred as TSECET for Diploma and Bsc mathematics students.

Graduate academics 
A three-year graduate program in the form of a Master's degree in Computer Applications (MCA) is offered by the college. Alongside this program, there is a two-year graduate program that offers a Masters in Engineering (M. E.) in four disciplines:
 Embedded Systems and VLSI Design
 Advanced Design and Manufacturing
 Communication Engineering & Signal Processing
 Power Systems & Power Electronics
& Masters in Technology (M. Tech) in one discipline:
 Computer Science & Engineering

The admissions for the ME programs is through the Graduate Aptitude Test in Engineering (GATE).

Other academic activities 
The Department of Civil Engineering has signed a Memorandum of Understanding with SatNav (Satyam Navigation), a GIS company promoted by Satyam Computer Services Limited.

The college offers a Java EE program as a value-added course. Another MoU was signed between Vasavi College of Engineering and Pramati Technologies in 2002. The J2EE Program at Vasavi College of Engineering started with the assistance of Pramati Technologies through the Education and Training Partnership initiative. Since then 200 students have been trained in Java technologies.

Students help organize and run the technical festival of the college, which is known as Acumen. Papers are invited from across the country. The festival spans 1– 2 days.

The college has a CSI student chapter, which is a team of six final year students elected every year by the Computer Science department, which conducts seminars and workshops related to the latest technologies.

Rankings

The National Institutional Ranking Framework (NIRF) ranked it 187 among engineering colleges in 2020.

Placements 
The Counselling and Placement Centre at the college provides a career-related support to its students.

More than 70 companies visit the campus every year to recruit students. These include companies like TCS, Infosys, Deloitte, Accenture, Accolite, Qualcomm, Netcracker, Oracle, Pega Systems, Tech Mahindra, Cognizant, Capgemini and ADP.

Acumen 

Acumen is the National Technical Symposium organised by Vasavi College of Engineering. It was first organised in the year 1996. Acumen is a three-day festival.

The fest runs around a theme "Youth-Technology-Future" that asserts the fact that the future of technology lies in the hands of the youth. The events conducted during this festival are technical grand prix, technical papers, blind coding, robotic competitions, poster presentations, rocketry, LAN gaming, constructors championship, technocraftz and spot events like Techno Witz, MineSweeper, Puzzle 'O' Mania, and PotPouri.

Euphoria 
Euphoria is the annual cultural festival of the college which will be held in spring every year. It is a three days festival. The events range from informals, literary and cultural events to Jukebox and Frag Central (Multiplayer Tournament). Go-Karting was also conducted on one occasion in the year 2002

The college has hosted entertainers including Jay Sean, Euphoria, Veronica, Shibani Kashyap, Yo Yo Honey Singh, Shivamani, Parikrama and Ryan Beck. In 2017, singer Nakash Aziz had come to the college for Euphoria. In 2018, singer Jonita Gandhi had come to college for euphoria and also DJ CARNIVORE had also come to the college.

Facilities 
The college has a Syndicate Bank facility within its premises. Internet access is available throughout the academic zone. The library has  over 130000 volumes. There are canteen facilities for students and faculty. There is also a playground for cricket, in addition to volleyball and basketball courts. There is also area for indoor games like chess, carroms, badminton and table tennis.

Value Added Courses 
In order to strengthen the teaching-learning ambience and  prepare the undergraduates to meet the challenges of the global work environment, the college has taken up several initiatives like offering value-added courses and interfacing with the industry to bridge the gap between the curriculum and the requirements of the industry.

Vasavi College of Engineering is one among the colleges that has introduced value-added courses in various disciplines such as CAD/CAM, GIS, VLSI, Embedded Systems, and DSP. The college has made forays into industry-institute interaction by signing MoUs with other renowned organizations in Andhra Pradesh.

Vasavi has introduced several value-added courses in various disciplines, such as: 
 Cisco Certifications
 CAD / CAM
 GIS
 VLSI
 Embedded Systems
 DSP

Alumni 
Vasavi College of Engineering Alumni Association (VCEAA) serves as the link for the college's alumni. The alumni are kept informed on happenings in the college. The college conducts an annual function, Reflections, in December which brings alumni together to the college campus. In Touch, the magazine brought out by the Alumni Association, keeps the alumni updated.

References

External links
 Official website
 College alumni

Engineering colleges in Hyderabad, India
1981 establishments in Andhra Pradesh
Educational institutions established in 1981